Pavlo Illichov (born August 24, 1983) is a Ukrainian former swimmer, who specialized in backstroke events. He won a silver medal in the 50 m backstroke at the 2001 European Junior Swimming Championships in Valletta, Malta (26.81). Illichov is a member of the swimming team for Dynamo Odessa, and is trained by his longtime coach and mentor Alla Timofeyeva.

Illichov qualified only for the men's 4 × 100 m medley relay, as a member of the Ukrainian team, at the 2004 Summer Olympics in Athens. Teaming with Oleg Lisogor (breaststroke), Andriy Serdinov (butterfly), and Yuriy Yegoshin (freestyle), Illichov led off a backstroke leg with a split of 56.19, but the Ukrainians settled only for sixth place in a final time of 3:36.87, six seconds off a new world record set by the winning U.S. team.

References

External links
Profile – Swim Ukraine 

1983 births
Living people
Ukrainian male backstroke swimmers
Olympic swimmers of Ukraine
Swimmers at the 2004 Summer Olympics
Sportspeople from Odesa
21st-century Ukrainian people